Georgi Kostadinov Georgiev (born 10 January 1963) is a Bulgarian retired footballer who played as an attacking midfielder. He was part of the Bulgaria national team that reached the semi-finals of the 1994 World Cup.

Club career
Georgiev started his career in Maritsa at the age of 17. He played for his first club from 1980 to 1984, when he was transferred to Botev Plovdiv.

After playing for Botev, Georgiev was transferred to CSKA Sofia. With this club, he became twice champion of Bulgaria in 1988–89 and 1989–90.

In 1991 Georgiev signed with French club FC Mulhouse, where he stayed for four years and reached his greatest form as a football player.

References

External links

1963 births
Living people
Bulgarian footballers
Association football midfielders
Bulgaria international footballers
1994 FIFA World Cup players
FC Maritsa Plovdiv players
Botev Plovdiv players
PFC CSKA Sofia players
FC Mulhouse players
First Professional Football League (Bulgaria) players
Bulgarian expatriate footballers
Bulgarian expatriate sportspeople in France
Expatriate footballers in France